Stephen Baxter may refer to:
Stephen Baxter (author) (born 1957), English science fiction author
Stephen Baxter (footballer) (born 1965), Northern Irish football manager and ex-player
Stephen B. Baxter, American historian
Steven Baxter, a character in the British drama The Second Coming
Steve Baxter (entrepreneur) (born 1971), Australian investor and entrepreneur
Steve Baxter (musician), American songwriter and guitarist